The Sa'ar 4.5-class missile boats is a class of Israeli Sea Corps missile boats designed and built by Israel Shipyards Ltd. as an improved and stretched . There are two different subclasses that are both named Sa'ar 4.5. The first subclass was initially called Chochit, but renamed to Aliya. Two Aliya-subclass boats are in service with the Mexican Navy. The second subclass was initially called Nirit but renamed to Hetz.

History
The original construction plan for Sa'ar 4.5-class missile boats included: 

Two helicopter-equipped boats (Aliya subclass):
 INS Aliya 
 INS Geula 

Three ordinary missile boats (Hetz subclass): 
 INS Romach (launched and commissioned in 1981), 
 INS Keshet (launched and commissioned in 1982) and 
 INS Nirit 

The keel of INS Nirit was laid in 1984 but the construction ceased due to lack of funds and it was finally launched in 1990 and commissioned in 1991 with some modern equipment, eventuality renamed to INS Hetz. Consequently the older INS Romach and INS Keshet were upgraded to match INS Hetzs specifications. 

Particularly INS Kidon and INS Yaffo were built comprising various older systems that were disassembled from Sa'ar 4-class boats with the same names, atop brand new Sa'ar 4.5-class hulls. INS Tarshish possibly also comprised some weapon systems dismounted from the Sa'ar 4-class missile boat with the same name, atop a new Sa'ar 4.5-class hull. 

Subclasses
Aliya subclass

The first two Sa'ar 4.5 boats were Aliya subclass. Additionally to the anti-ship missiles, these missile boats were equipped with aviation facilities that could accommodate two (one on a regular basis) Bell 206, MD 500, or HH-65 helicopters. Eurocopter Panther was the last helicopter deployed on these boats in the Israeli Navy. The Aliya subclass are the smallest warships with a helipad and helicopter hangar.

In August 1984, INS Aliya and INS Geula were sent to destroy a terrorist facility in Nahr al-Bared, northern Lebanon. Two MD 500 Defenders from INS Aliya and another two from INS Geula successfully hit the target. In July 1985, INS Aliya and INS Geula carried out a similar mission near Nahr al-Bared.

Hetz subclass

Sa'ar 4.5 Hetz-subclass missile boats lack the helicopter facilities of the Aliya subclass, but have more weapon systems fitted. The engines and propulsion systems were also upgraded. The boat itself is  longer than the s to accommodate the new systems.

Future replacement
Beginning in the mid-2020s, the Israeli Navy plans to replace the Sa'ar 4.5 boats with the future Reshef-class ships. They will deploy advanced weaponry and defensive systems, including C-Dome.

Users
Israel
As of 2019, eight Hetz-subclass boats are in service with the Israeli Navy.

Mexico
In January 2004 both INS Aliya and INS Geula were sold to Mexico for service in the Mexican Navy. Press reports indicate that Israel removed the Harpoon missile systems prior to the sale, however, the Gabriel anti-ship missile systems were included in the package.

Greece
The Hellenic Coast Guard bought three offshore patrol boats based on the Sa'ar 4.5 Nirit''-class design, but armed only with a 30 mm gun. A crane is installed at the deck space normally reserved for missiles.

See also
 List of ships of the Israeli Navy

References

External links

 Aliya on Global Security
 Hetz on Global Security
 Sa'ar 4.5 on Israel Shipyards website
 Sa'ar on SIBAT website

Missile boat classes
 
 
 
Patrol vessels of the Hellenic Coast Guard